Basaral (Basaral) is an island in Lake Balkhash. It is located in the southwestern portion of the lake.

Geography
Ortaaral is a similar smaller island located to the southeast of Basaral's southern end. The shore of the island is rocky and its maximum height reaches . The vegetation is sparse and is mainly composed of Salsola, Caragana and Anabasis scrub.

Administratively Basaral Island belongs to the Moiynkum District of the Jambyl Region of Kazakhstan.

See also
List of islands of Kazakhstan

References

Lake Balkhash
Lake islands of Kazakhstan